Paddington is a 2014 live-action animated comedy film written and directed by Paul King. It was developed from a story by King and Hamish McColl, which was based on the stories of the character Paddington Bear created by Michael Bond. Produced by David Heyman, Paddington stars Ben Whishaw as the voice of the title character, with Hugh Bonneville, Sally Hawkins, Julie Walters, Jim Broadbent, Peter Capaldi, and Nicole Kidman in live-action roles. The film tells the story of Paddington, an anthropomorphic bear who migrates from the jungles of "Darkest Peru" to the streets of London, where he is adopted by the Brown family. Kidman plays a taxidermist who attempts to add him to her collection.

A British and French venture produced by StudioCanal UK, TF1, and Heyday, Paddingtons principal photography began in September 2013 and wrapped up in June 2014. Colin Firth was originally set to voice Paddington, but dropped out in post-production and was replaced by Whishaw.

Paddington was released in the United Kingdom on 28 November 2014 to critical acclaim for Whishaw's vocal performance, humour, screenplay, visual effects and appeal to children and adults. It grossed $268 million worldwide on a €38.5 (~$55) million budget. It received two nominations at the BAFTAs: Best British Film and  Best Adapted Screenplay. A sequel, Paddington 2, was released in 2017, with King and much of the cast returning.

Plot
In the deep jungles of "Darkest Peru", a British geographer discovers a previously unknown species of bear. He learns that the bears are highly intelligent and that they have a deep fondness for marmalade. He names them Lucy and Pastuzo and gives them his hat as he leaves, telling the bears that they are always welcome if they wish to go to London.

Forty years later, the two bears are living in harmony with their orphaned nephew until an earthquake destroys their home, forcing them to seek shelter underground. Pastuzo fails to reach the shelter in time and is killed by a falling tree. Lucy encourages her nephew to go and find solace in London, while she moves into the Home for Retired Bears.

The young bear arrives in London on a cargo ship and eventually reaches Paddington Station. He meets the Brown family, who take him home and name him after the station they found him in. Henry Brown, the father and a devoted risk analyst, does not believe Paddington's story and is adamant that Paddington stay only one night, but his wife Mary and their two children, Jonathan and Judy, find him endearing, as does Mrs. Bird, the housekeeper.

Paddington thinks he can find a home with the explorer who met Lucy and Pastuzo, but does not know his name. After finding no mention of his expedition on the Internet, Mary takes Paddington to Samuel Gruber, an antique shop owner who discovers that the hat bears the stamp of the Geographers' Guild, but the Guild has no record of an expedition to Peru. With the help of Henry, Paddington infiltrates the Guild's archive and discovers an expedition to Peru was undertaken by the explorer, whose name is Montgomery Clyde (although the Guild erased their record of the expedition).

Meanwhile, the hateful museum taxidermist Millicent Clyde kills and stuffs exotic animals to house them in the Natural History Museum. When she learns of Paddington's existence, she immediately sets out to hunt him down. The Brown family departs for the day, leaving Paddington home alone. Scheming with the Browns' nosy but unsuspecting next-door neighbour, Mr. Curry, Millicent sneaks in and attempts to capture Paddington; he manages to defend himself, but inadvertently starts a fire in the process. Paddington tries to tell the Browns his story of Millicent's kidnap attempt, but no one believes him.

That night, Paddington leaves the house and attempts to track down Montgomery Clyde himself, using the phone book to find the addresses of every "M. Clyde" in London. He eventually finds Millicent's house, and learns that Montgomery Clyde, who was Millicent's father, died a long time ago. Millicent resents her father for losing his Guild membership after he refused to bring a Peruvian bear specimen home and subsequently opened a petting zoo. She tranquilizes Paddington and prepares to stuff him, but when Mr. Curry discovers her true intentions, he warns the Brown family and they come to save Paddington. They rescue him, and when Millicent is about to shoot Paddington on the roof, Mrs. Bird opens a hatch, pushing her off.

In the aftermath, the Browns allow Paddington to stay in their house permanently. Millicent is arrested and sentenced to community service in her father's petting zoo. Paddington writes to Aunt Lucy, saying he is happy and has finally found a home.

Cast

 Ben Whishaw as the voice of Paddington Bear
 Hugh Bonneville as Henry Brown
 Sally Hawkins as Mary Brown
 Madeleine Harris as Judy Brown
 Samuel Joslin as Jonathan Brown
 Julie Walters as Mrs Bird
 Nicole Kidman as Millicent Clyde
 Lottie Steer as Young Millicent
 Peter Capaldi as Mr Curry
 Jim Broadbent as Samuel Gruber
 Imelda Staunton as the voice of Aunt Lucy
 Michael Gambon as the voice of Uncle Pastuzo
 Tim Downie as Montgomery Clyde
 Simon Farnaby as Barry, a security guard
 Matt Lucas as taxi driver Joe
 Matt King as Andre the Thief
 Madeleine Worrall as Agatha Clyde
 Geoffrey Palmer as The Boss Geographer 
 Michael Bond as The Kindly Gentleman
 Kayvan Novak as Grant
 Alice Lowe as the Geographer's Guild receptionist
 Steve Edge as the Natural History Museum Security Guard

Production

The film was first announced in September 2007, with David Heyman producing and Hamish McColl writing the screenplay. Further developments were not made until September 2013, when filming began and Heyman announced the casting of Colin Firth as Paddington. With a budget of €38.5 million ($50–55 million), Paddington is the most expensive film produced by the French production company StudioCanal. Principal photography and production began on 13 September 2013.

Filming locations for Paddington were mostly in West London. The Paddington Station scenes were mostly filmed inside London Paddington station, although the exterior establishing shot used the front entrance of nearby Marylebone Station in Marylebone. Exterior shots of the Brown family home in Windsor Gardens were shot in Chalcot Crescent in Primrose Hill. Scenes in Mr. Gruber's shop were filmed inside an antique shop on Portobello Road, and the skateboard chase sequence was filmed in Portobello Road Market and Maida Vale. For the fictional Tube station, Westbourne Oak, three separate locations were used: the entrance hall at Maida Vale tube station, on the escalators inside St John's Wood tube station, and on the disused Jubilee line platforms in Charing Cross tube station. The exterior and entrance hall of the Reform Club on Pall Mall served at the location for the Geographers' Guild, while the other interior scenes were filmed inside Hatfield House in Hertfordshire. Museum scenes were shot at the Natural History Museum in South Kensington, and a house on Downshire Hill in Hampstead served as the home of Millicent Clyde.

In June 2014, after principal photography had wrapped, Firth voluntarily dropped out of the film, after the studio decided his voice was not suitable for Paddington. The role was recast the following month, with Ben Whishaw signing on to voice the title role. Paddington was created using a combination of computer-generated imagery (by the British company Framestore) and animatronics.

In the Ukrainian dub, Paddington was voiced by Volodymyr Zelenskyy, who went on to become the president of Ukraine.

Soundtrack

Nick Urata composed the film's soundtrack. Gwen Stefani and Pharrell Williams were commissioned to write a song for the film's American release, which turned into "Shine".

Release

Video game
A video game based on the film, titled Paddington: Adventures in London, was released on 11 August 2015 for Nintendo 3DS and is published by Humongous Entertainment through their Kids' Mania label.

Home media
Paddington was released on Blu-ray, DVD and streaming on 23 March 2015 in the UK, and on 28 April 2015 in the United States.

Reception

Classification
In November 2014 the British Board of Film Classification (BBFC) gave the film a PG certificate for its UK release and advised parents that the film contained "dangerous behaviour, mild threat, mild sex references [and] mild bad language." Paul King, the film's director, told BBC reporter Tim Muffett: "I'm not surprised about that [the PG certificate] but I don't think it's a PG for sexiness. That I would find very odd." Paddington's creator, Michael Bond, said he was "totally amazed" at the BBFC's advice. After the film's distributor challenged the certification, the BBFC revised the wording of its parental guidance, replacing "mild sex references" with "innuendo." It also further qualified the "mild bad language" as "infrequent", saying it referred to "a single mumbled use of 'bloody'."

Box office
Paddington was released on 28 November 2014 in the United Kingdom, where it took in $8 million (£5.1 million) on its opening weekend, and topped the box office for two weeks. It was StudioCanal's highest opening and the second-highest 2014 family film debut in the country behind The Lego Movie. For the week ending 9 December 2014 it topped the box office in France. For the week ending 24 December 2014 it topped the box office in Australia.

The film was released in the United States by TWC-Dimension on 16 January 2015. The film opened to third place in its first weekend, earning $19.0 million, behind American Sniper and The Wedding Ringer, and closed with a total of $76.3 million.

It opened at no.1 at the Japan box office in January 2016 with $1.1 million and went on to gross $5.7 million.

Critical response
On review aggregator Rotten Tomatoes 97% of 162 reviews were positive, with an average rating of 7.90/10. The site states that "Paddington brings a beloved children's character into the 21st century without sacrificing his essential charm, delivering a family-friendly adventure as irresistibly cuddly as its star." On Metacritic, the film has a score of 77 out of 100, based on 38 critics, indicating "generally favorable reviews". Audiences polled by CinemaScore gave the film a grade of "A" on an A+ to F scale.

Upon its UK release, Peter Bradshaw of The Guardian gave the film four out of five stars, saying: "the new CGI-live-action Paddington Bear could easily have been another garish, cheapo Brit-movie. Instead, writer-director Paul King ... and co-writer Hamish McColl have created a charming and sweet-natured family film, full of wit and fun, skewed towards young children but cheekily speckled with sly gags pitched at the older audience." Geoffrey Macnab of The Independent called it a "film of considerable charm but one undermined by a very bitty and flimsy screenplay. Writer-director Paul King has more flair for comic set-pieces than he does for sustained narrative."

Indiewire said critics were "pleasantly surprised" and that the film was "hailed for its warm-heartedness and playful sense of humor ... and Whishaw's charming performance". Guy Lodge of Variety praised it for "honouring the everyday quirks of Bond's stories, while subtly updating their middle-class London milieu". Leslie Felperin of The Hollywood Reporter gave the film a positive review, saying: "It's a relief to report that the final film is actually quite charming, thoughtful and as cuddly as a plush toy, albeit one with a few modern gizmos thrown in." Ignatiy Vishnevetsky of The A.V. Club gave the film a B, saying: "If the film seems head-and-shoulders above the average effects-driven family-matinee flick, it's because it never gives the impression that it's trying to be anything more (or less) than good-natured and fun to watch." Jason Clark of Entertainment Weekly gave the film an A−, saying: "A gloriously whimsical big-screen debut that's closer to the madcap spirit of the Muppets and the lovingly rendered style of a Wes Anderson film than to standard multiplex family fodder." Claudia Puig of USA Today gave the film three out of four stars, saying: "Paddington'''s journey from South America to London is just droll enough for adults – qualifying as a gentle parable about xenophobia – and exuberant enough for the youngest viewers." Moira MacDonald of The Seattle Times gave the film three out of five stars, saying: "Paddington is, ultimately, about how a newcomer can become part of a family, and about how good manners and marmalade can get you out of any tricky situation – delightful messages, at any age." Bruce Demara of the Toronto Star gave the film three out of four stars, saying: "It's a relief to say that – as films based on fictional animals go – Paddington is better than merely bearable."

Barbara VanDenburgh of The Arizona Republic gave the film three and a half stars out of five, saying: "Paddington is a mostly smart update loaded with charm, and it preserves enough of the fuzzy feelings for purists to walk away with a smile." Peter Travers of Rolling Stone gave the film four out of five stars, saying: "An irresistible charmbomb. The in-jokes are verbal and visual, managing to reference themes as diverse as immigration and insider trading. It's all very droll and quietly, memorably dazzling." Sandie Angulo Chen of The Washington Post gave the film three out of four stars, saying: "Because of its adorable protagonist, laugh-out-loud gags and touching premise, Paddington succeeds in a way most CGI/live-action hybrids do not." Betsy Sharkey of the Los Angeles Times gave the film a positive review, saying: "Artfully and cleverly, the sweet spirit of that young bear from darkest Peru and his many London misadventures materializes brilliantly on screen in the very good hands of writer-director-conjurer Paul King."

Mary Houlihan of the Chicago Sun-Times gave the film three and a half stars out of four, saying: "This is a charming film whose underlying message of tolerance and acceptance strikes a palpable chord in today's world – both for children and adults." Jocelyn Noveck of the Associated Press gave the film a positive review, saying: "For parents looking for a film that'll please them and their kids in equal measure, Paddington is—as Goldilocks would say in that other bear story—just right." Tom Long of The Detroit News gave the film a B+, saying: "Paddington is an absolute delight, visually inventive, thoroughly goofy and goosed by a mix of dry British wit and pratfall shenanigans."

Two years after the film's release, in 2016, Empire magazine ranked Paddington 81st on their list of the 100 best British films, with their entry stating, “A great big hug of a movie, Paddington'' charmed the public and critics alike in one of the nicest surprises of 2014, adding itself to the canon of beloved Christmas movies.”

Accolades

Franchise

Sequels

A sequel to the film was released on 10 November 2017 in the United Kingdom. David Heyman returned to produce. Paul King returned to direct and co-wrote the sequel with Simon Farnaby. A third film has also been confirmed.

Television series
On 9 October 2017, it was announced that StudioCanal were producing an animated TV series based on the films called The Adventures of Paddington, set to launch in either late 2018 or early 2019. It was announced in February 2019, that the series would launch worldwide in 2020 on Nickelodeon, with Whishaw reprising his voice of Paddington.

References in other media 
 The film briefly features in the third episode of the second season of His Dark Materials, when Lyra Belacqua and Will Parry escape into a cinema to watch it. The visual effects company Framestore provided the animation for both Paddington and His Dark Materials.

References

External links

 
 

Paddington Bear
2014 films
2010s children's comedy films
Animated films set in England
Animated films set in London
British children's comedy films
British comedy films
British children's fantasy films
Films about bears
Films based on British novels
Films based on children's books
Films produced by David Heyman
Films set in England
Films set in London
Films set in Peru
Films set in South America
Films shot in England
Films shot in Hertfordshire
Films shot in London
French children's films
French comedy films
French fantasy films
Heyday Films films
Films using motion capture
StudioCanal films
StudioCanal animated films
TF1 Films Production films
Films about immigration to Europe
Films directed by Paul King (director)
Films with live action and animation
2014 comedy films
Films set in museums
2010s English-language films
2010s American films
2010s British films
2010s French films